Jules Sobrian (born January 22, 1935, in San Fernando, Trinidad and Tobago), is a medical doctor, competitive marksman and author, who immigrated to Canada at the age of 21 and resides in Omemee, Ontario. Sobrian began shooting competitively at Hart House Revolver Club at the University of Toronto while studying medicine. He has competed for Canada in pistol-shooting events at four Olympic Games, and has won five individual medals in pistol-shooting at three Commonwealth Games and four individual medals in pistol-shooting at three Pan American Games. He won the Championship of the Americas in Free Pistol in 1973.

He was interviewed on the series Still Standing in 2016, where he talked about his role looking for pollution sources in the community. He thwarted a murder attempt by a business owner by tackling the rifle-toting man, hurling him about, and then medically assisting him before taking him to the hospital.

Commonwealth Games Medals
Sobrian won medals in individual pistol-shooting events at the Commonwealth Games as follows:
 gold medal in the Rapid-Fire Pistol event at the 1978 Commonwealth Games
 gold medal in the Free Pistol event and silver medal in the Rapid-Fire Pistol event at the 1974 Commonwealth Games
 silver medal in the Free Pistol event and bronze medal in the Rapid-Fire Pistol event at the 1966 Commonwealth Games

Pan American Games Medals
Sobrian won medals in individual pistol-shooting events at the Pan American Games as follows:
 silver medal in the Men's 25-metre Rapid Fire Pistol event and bronze medal in the Men's 50-metre Free Pistol event at the 1975 Pan American Games
 bronze medal in the Men's 25-metre Center Fire Pistol event at the 1967, 1971 and 1975 Pan American Games.

Championship of the Americas Medals
Sobrian won the gold medal in the 50M Free Pistol in the 1973 Championships of the Americas and bronze in the 25M centre fire event.

International Practical Shooting Confederation
Sobrian currently shoots IPSC at the Peterborough Fish and Game Association.

References

1935 births
Living people
Trinidad and Tobago emigrants to Canada
University of Toronto alumni
Olympic shooters of Canada
Canadian male sport shooters
21st-century Canadian novelists
Shooters at the 1968 Summer Olympics
Shooters at the 1972 Summer Olympics
Shooters at the 1976 Summer Olympics
Shooters at the 1984 Summer Olympics
Shooters at the 1966 British Empire and Commonwealth Games
Shooters at the 1974 British Commonwealth Games
Shooters at the 1978 Commonwealth Games
Commonwealth Games medallists in shooting
Commonwealth Games gold medallists for Canada
Commonwealth Games silver medallists for Canada
Commonwealth Games bronze medallists for Canada
Pan American Games medalists in shooting
Pan American Games silver medalists for Canada
Pan American Games bronze medalists for Canada
Canadian male novelists
21st-century Canadian male writers
Shooters at the 1967 Pan American Games
Shooters at the 1971 Pan American Games
Shooters at the 1975 Pan American Games
People from San Fernando, Trinidad and Tobago
Medalists at the 1967 Pan American Games
Medalists at the 1971 Pan American Games
Medalists at the 1975 Pan American Games
Medallists at the 1966 British Empire and Commonwealth Games
Medallists at the 1974 British Commonwealth Games
Medallists at the 1978 Commonwealth Games